Keith Elder (born 14 July 1940) is a Canadian former sports shooter. He competed in the 25 metre pistol event at the 1968 Summer Olympics.

Elder was inducted into the Manitoba Sports Hall of Fame in 2009.

References

External links
 

1940 births
Living people
Canadian male sport shooters
Olympic shooters of Canada
Shooters at the 1968 Summer Olympics
Sportspeople from Brandon, Manitoba
20th-century Canadian people